Bisotun-e Bon Rud (also Romanized as Bīsotūn-e Bon Rūd; also known as Bīsotūn) is a village in Dasht-e Arzhan Rural District, Arzhan District, Shiraz County, Fars Province, Iran. At the 2006 census, its population was 29, in 8 families.

References 

Populated places in Shiraz County